The women's 50 metre freestyle competition of the swimming events at the 2011 Pan American Games took place on October 21 at the Scotiabank Aquatics Center in the municipality of Zapopan, near Guadalajara, Mexico.  The defending Pan American Games champion is Arlene Semeco of Venezuela.

This race consisted of one length of the pool in freestyle.

Records
Prior to this competition, the existing world and Pan American Games records were as follows:

Qualification
Each National Olympic Committee (NOC) was able to enter up to two entrants providing they had met the A standard (26.4) in the qualifying period (January 1, 2010 to September 4, 2011). NOCs were also permitted to enter one athlete providing they had met the B standard (27.2) in the same qualifying period.

Results
All times are in minutes and seconds.

Heats
The first round was held on October 21.

B Final 
The B final was also held on October 21.

A Final 
The A final was also held on October 21.

References

Swimming at the 2011 Pan American Games
2011 in women's swimming